Nongthombam Sarojkumar (born 3 February 1994) is an Indian cricketer. He made his Twenty20 debut on 17 January 2021, for Manipur in the 2020–21 Syed Mushtaq Ali Trophy.

References

External links
 

1994 births
Living people
Indian cricketers
Manipur cricketers
Place of birth missing (living people)